Burnthouse is a hamlet in the civil parish of Ponsanooth, Cornwall, England.

References

Hamlets in Cornwall